The 2012–13 Southern Hemisphere tropical cyclone season may refer to one of three different basins and respective seasons:

2012-13 Australian region cyclone season, between 90°E and 160°E
2012-13 South Pacific cyclone season, east of 160°E